The 2020–21 Slovak First Football League (known as the Slovak Fortuna liga for sponsorship reasons) was the 28th season of first-tier football league in Slovakia since its establishment in 1993.

Slovan Bratislava were the defending champions for the second successive year, after picking up the domestic double in the previous season. Slovan successfully defended their title, winning their third consecutive title and record-extending 11th Slovak title overall.

In this season, teams were allowed to make five substitutions during matches in a maximum of three stoppages in play for one team.

Teams
Twelve teams competed in the league – all sides from the previous season.

Stadiums and locations

Personnel and kits

Managerial changes

Regular stage

League table

Results
Each team plays home-and-away against every other team in the league, for a total of 22 matches each.

Championship group

Relegation group

Europa Conference League play-offs
Should one of the top 3 teams win the 2020–21 Slovak Cup, Europa Conference League qualification playoffs will be held among the 4th, 5th, 6th team in the championship group and the top team of the relegation round. On 19 May 2021, Slovan Bratislava, who have won the league title, also won the cup, thus confirming the need of playoffs.

The 4th team play the top team of the relegation group and the 5th play the 6th in the semifinals. Winners of the semifinals play the final to determine the Europa Conference League qualification spot. Europa Conference League qualification playoff games are one-leg and played at the home pitch of the higher-ranked team. The winners qualify for the first qualifying round of the 2021–22 UEFA Europa Conference League.

Semi-finals

Final

Relegation play-offs
The team which finished 11th faced the 2nd team from 2. Liga 2020–21 for one spot in the top flight the next season.

All times are CEST (UTC+2).

First leg

Second leg

Position by round
The table lists the positions of teams after each week of matches. In order to preserve chronological progress, any postponed matches are not included in the round at which they were originally scheduled but added to the full round they were played immediately afterwards. For example, if a match is scheduled for matchday 13, but then postponed and played between days 16 and 17, it will be added to the standings for day 16.

Source: Fortunaliga.sk

Season statistics

Top goalscorers

1 plus 1 play-off goal 
2 plus 2 play-off goals

Top assists

Hat-tricks

Clean sheets

Discipline

Player

Most yellow cards: 10
  Joeri de Kamps (Slovan Bratislava)
  Martin Mikovič (Spartak Trnava)

Most red cards: 2
  Tomáš Hučko (Sereď)
  Abdul Zubairu (Trenčín)
  Aschraf El Mahdioui (Trenčín)

Club

Most yellow cards: 84
Sereď

Most red cards: 6
Spartak Trnava

Awards

Monthly awards

1 Vote of the player of the month was united for November and December.

Annual awards

Team of the Season

Team of the Season was:
Goalkeeper:  Dominik Greif (Slovan Bratislava)
Defence:  Vernon De Marco (Slovan Bratislava),  Jakub Piotr Kiwior (Žilina),  Vasil Bozhikov (Slovan Bratislava),  César Blackman (DAC Dunajská Streda)
Midfield:   David Hrnčár (Zlaté Moravce),  Joeri de Kamps (Slovan Bratislava),  Zsolt Kalmár (DAC Dunajská Streda),  Rafael Ratão (Slovan Bratislava)
Attack:  David Strelec (Slovan Bratislava),  Eric Ramírez (DAC Dunajská Streda)

Top Eleven U-21
Source:
Goalkeeper:   Samuel Petráš (Žilina)
Defence:  César Blackman (DAC Dunajská Streda),  Jakub Piotr Kiwior (Žilina), Branislav Sluka (Žilina)
Midfield:  David Strelec (Slovan Bratislava),  Saymon Cabral (Spartak Trnava),  András Schäfer (DAC Dunajská Streda),  Dávid Ďuriš (Žilina),  Marko Divković (DAC Dunajská Streda)
Attack:   Dawid Kurminowski (Žilina),  Eric Ramírez (DAC Dunajská Streda)

Individual Awards

Manager of the season

 Pavol Staňo (Žilina)

Player of the Year

 Zsolt Kalmár (DAC Dunajská Streda)

Young player of the Year

 David Hrnčár (Zlaté Moravce)

See also
2020–21 Slovak Cup
2020–21 2. Liga (Slovakia)
List of Slovak football transfers summer 2020
List of Slovak football transfers winter 2020–21
List of foreign Slovak First League players

Notes

References

External links

Slovak
2020-21
1